Yangluo Line of the Wuhan Metro was opened on 26 December 2017.

It is the seventh line of the Wuhan Metro to be opened since its creation.

History

Stations

Future Development
A 3.2 km extension with 2 stations is under planning.

Notes

References

 
Railway lines opened in 2017
2017 establishments in China